Maribel Gonçalves (born 1 April 1978) is a Portuguese racewalker. She competed in the women's 20 kilometres walk at the 2004 Summer Olympics.

References

1978 births
Living people
Athletes (track and field) at the 2004 Summer Olympics
Portuguese female racewalkers
Olympic athletes of Portugal
Place of birth missing (living people)